MS Bantam , , was built by N.V. Machinefabriek & Scheepswerf van P. Smit Jr. of Rotterdam, Netherlands in 1939 for Koninklijke Rotterdamsche Lloyd.

MS Bantam  operated under charter by both the United States and the United Kingdom during World War II.  It was used in trans-Atlantic convoys from and to New York City on a regular basis from April 1944 to April 1945. The ship was returned to the original owners in 1946.

After wartime service the ship was returned to Koninklijke Rotterdamsche Lloyd in 1946 and resumed cargo and passenger service in the Indies as the colony became Indonesia until sold in 1964. Under the Pacific Pearl Navigation Co. Ltd., Hong Kong  the name was changed to Pacific Pearl. In 1969 the ship changed ownership to Marmando Compañia Naviera S.A., Panama with another change to Millstar (possibly Mill Star) until sold for scrapping in China in 1971.

References

References cited

External links
Bantam Koninklijke Rotterdamsche Lloyd  Museum, Bantam photo gallery
Rotterdamsche Lloyd—Nederlandsch-Indië Koninklijke Rotterdamsche Lloyd  Museum, in Dutch, showing routes and history
The Canadian Theosophist "Professor Wood in Manilla" from MV Bantam July 24, 1946 mentioning devastation of Manilla, Batavia, Soerabaya and Macassar as Bantam is delayed by "shortage of loading facilities"

1938 ships
Ships built in Rotterdam
Merchant ships of the Netherlands
World War II merchant ships of the Netherlands